Dasyvesica crinitalis is a species of snout moth in the genus Dasyvesica. It is found in Guatemala.

References

Moths described in 1922
Epipaschiinae